The Whistler Film Festival Documentary Award is an annual juried award, given by the Whistler Film Festival to the film selected as the year's best documentary film in the festival program.

Winners

References

External links

Canadian documentary film awards
Whistler Film Festival